Thomas Messingham was an Irish hagiologist, born in the Diocese of Meath. He studied in the Irish College, Paris, proceeding to the degree of S.T.D. Among the Franciscan Manuscripts in Dublin is an interesting tract sent by David Rothe, Vice-Primate of All Ireland, addressed to my "loving friend Mr. Thomas Messingham at his chambers in Paris", dated 1615. It is evident that at this date Messingham was one of the staff of the Irish College in that city, and was commencing his studies on Irish saints.

In 1620 he published Offices of Saints Patrick, Brigid, Columba, and other Irish saints; and in the following year was appointed rector of the Irish College, Paris, in succession to his friend and diocesan, Thomas Dease, who was promoted to the Bishopric of Meath, on 5 May 1621. Messingham was honoured by the Holy See, and was raised to the dignity of prothonotary Apostolic, and acted as agent for many of the Irish bishops. As well as seeking materials with a view to an ecclesiastical history of Ireland, Messingham was rector of the Irish College, and organized the course of studies with a view of sending forth capable missionaries to work in their native country. He got the college affiliated formally to the University of Paris, and, in 1626, got the approbation of the Archbishop of Paris for the rules he had drawn up for the government of the Irish seminary.

In 1624 he published, in Paris, his famous work on Irish saints, Florilegium Insulæ Sanctorum, containing also a treatise on St. Patrick's Purgatory, in Lough Derg. In the same year he was appointed by the Holy See to the Deanery of St. Patrick's Cathedral, Dublin, in succession to Henry Byrne, but this position was merely honorary, inasmuch as all the temporalities were enjoyed by the Protestant dean, by patent from the Crown. Messingham had a lengthy correspondence with Father Luke Wadding, O.F.M., and was frequently consulted by the Roman authorities in the matter of selecting suitable ecclesiastics to fill the vacant Irish sees.  On 15 July 1630, he wrote to Wadding that he feared it was in vain to hope for any indulgences in religious disabilities from King Charles I. Between the years 1632 and 1638 he laboured for the Irish Church in various capacities, but his name disappears after the latter year, whence we may conclude that he either resigned or died in 1638.

External links

Attribution

Charles Jourdain, Histoire de l'Université de Paris (Paris, 1866);
Patrick Boyle, The Irish College in Paris (London, 1901);
Report on Franciscan Manuscripts, Hist. Manuscripts Com. (Dublin, 1905).

Christian hagiographers
University of Paris alumni
Year of birth unknown
Year of death unknown
17th-century Irish people
17th-century Irish historians
People from County Meath